Insektors (stylized as InseKtorS) was a 1994 French computer-animated TV series, and was one of the earliest computer animated series, predating VeggieTales and ReBoot. Made in a small studio, Fantome  in France, it was the 1994 recipient of a "Children and Young People" Emmy Award, and was the very first film to ever be given an Academy Award for "Young People’s Honoree"

Production and dubbing
The series was created in 1993 and aired in early 1994 in France. It was then dubbed into two English language releases; one for North America, and one for the UK.

The North American version was recorded in Paris. It was first aired on Canadian television on YTV.

For the UK version, the script was re-written; characters had different names, and different dialogue was used. Jokes and references specific to British/English culture were also used.

Characters
The French name is given first followed by the British name in brackets, and if there is an alternate North American name, this is indicated by a slash.

Joyces
Joyces (Verigreens) are colorful, cheerful insects and offshoots of the Yuk/Krud civilization who broke away from their dark cousins upon the arrival of the Great Prism which nourished the site where it landed, resulting in the creation of Flower City. They are peaceful people who devote their lives to merrymaking and protecting the Great Prism from harm. Joyce citizens who are not main characters resemble bees.

Fulgor (Flynn)
Original Voice: David Gasman
Teddy Kempner (UK dub)
 A walking stick born a Yuk/Krud, Fulgor/Flynn was adopted from a young age. Armed with the mighty Kolour Guitar/Musical Colour Gun - an electric guitar that fires blasts of colorful pollen - he is the brave, and sometimes reckless, champion in the fight against the Yuks/Kruds.

Aelia (Alex)
Original Voice:  Karen Strassman
Caroline Bliss (UK dub)
 A butterfly. She is the daughter of the Joyce/Verigreen leader and adopted sister of Fulgor/Flynn. She tends to the Great Prism and assists her father in his scientific explorations. She has romantic feelings for Acylius/Max.

Le Grand Artificier/The Great Pyro (Godfrey)
Original Voice: Christian Erickson
Andy Secombe (UK dub)
 A butterfly. The slightly eccentric leader of the Joyces/Verigreens, descendant to his Great Great Grandfather who was mentioned in Planet Karbon/The Black Planet, and is the biological father of Aelia/Alex and adoptive father of Fulgor/Flynn. He is talented as a scientist and mystic.

Daltonio (Bentley)
A greenfly. The Great Pyro's/Godfrey's main assistant.

Gallopus (Peg)
A mechanical horse-like robot. Fleet of foot (and flight), he was originally created by Eurekas/Magus. He is Fulgor's/Flynn's steed and close confidante, but unable to speak outside of honks and squeaks. In the UK dub, Peg is female.

Spotty (Elmo)
 Another machine like Gallopus/Peg, he is a small flier. He has a large spotlight in his stomach to illuminate dark areas.

Beurks/Yuks
Beurks/Yuks (Kruds) are monochromatic insects that live in a rotting tree stump in a swamp - they continually try to conquer the Flower City in the name of their Queen, namely for the fuel source the flowers provide. Exposure to brightly colored substances (pollen, juices from mushrooms) causes them to enter states of uninhibited laughter. Yuk soldiers that are not main characters resemble crickets, whereas Yuk citizens that are not main characters are beetles.

Reine/Queen Bakrakra (Queen Katheter the Third)
Voiced by: Andy Secombe (UK dub)
A praying mantis. Queen Bakrakra/Katheter the Third is the fearsome ruler of the Yuks/Kruds, and a descendant of the tyrannical King Bakrakro/Katheter the First. She is so cold-hearted that she must spend much of her time in a massive warming furnace.

Prince Acylius (Prince Maximillian)
Voiced by: Teddy Kempner (UK dub)
 A mantis. The son of Queen Bakrakra/Katheter, and heir to the Yuk/Krud throne. He has romantic feelings for Aelia/Alex. And unlike the others, he likes flowers.

Lord Krabo (Lord Draffsack)
Original Voice: Paul Bandey
Neil McCaul (UK dub)
A cockroach. Grouchy, stressed, power-hungry, egotistical and something of a coward, the Prime Minister of the Yuks/Kruds.

Lord Teknocratus (Lord Synapse)
Voiced by: Neil McCaul (UK dub)
A weevil. The constantly relaxed chief engineer of the Yuks/Kruds who tirelessly creates contraptions to further their cause, or reverses the unfortunate effects of Joyce/Verigreen counter-attacks. Krabo/Draffsack is always blaming him when his inventions fail to deliver the desired results.

Lord Kretinus (Corporal Fugg)
Original Voice: David Gasman
Andy Secombe (UK dub)
 A weevil. He is Lord Krabo/Draffsack and General Lukanus's/Wasabi's clumsy and slow-witted assistant, constantly trying to please his superiors.

General Lukanus (General Wasabi)
Original Voice: Edward Marcus
Neil McCaul (UK dub)
 A beetle. He is the arrogant commander of the Yuk/Krud army, carrying out the schemes of Krabo/Draffsack and Teknocratus/Synapse, although his greatest loyalty is to Queen Bakrakra/Katheter.

 Captain Krabouic and Lieutenant Kaboche (Captain Roderick Drumsturdy and Corporal Stanley Greeb)
 The twin heads of security, test pilots, and commandos. Krabouic/Drumsturdy is taller and more headstrong, while Kaboche/Greeb is shorter, more cowardly.

The Guards (The Methane Brothers)
 The two rhinoceros beetles who guard the main entrance into the Yuk/Krud castle. They are generally slow-witted, easily distracted, and quite eccentric.

Eric
 A rhinoceros beetle who serves as a prison guard for Yuk/Krud City.

Protokol (Kopius)
Original Voice: David Gasman
Teddy Kempner (UK dub)
A cockchafer. He is the aloof Yuk/Krud herald who announces each character's entrance (often unnecessarily). He uses what limited chances to speak he has to throw barbs at his superiors.

Eurekas (Magus)
 A walking stick. Introduced in the last episode of the first season, he is the biological father of Fulgor/Flynn and formerly Teknocratus's/Synapse's predecessor/colleague.

Technology
The French name is given first followed by the British name in brackets, and if there is an alternate North American name, this is indicated by a slash.

Joyces
The Great Prism (The Great Prism)
 A glowing multicolored cube that resides in a high tower. The Great Prism is the energy source of the Joyces/Verigreens which keeps their flower city alive. The Prism seems to be a living organism that can communicate vocally and through image projections. It is kept functioning by bathing it in the nectar of a water plant that grows in Yuk/Krud territory. It can die if it is not maintained properly.

Kolour Guitar (Musical Colour Gun)
 A handheld contraption used by Fulgor/Flynn. Though outwardly it resembles and plays like a guitar, violent plucking of its strings will cause it to fire blasts of colored pollen. The blasts have no effect on Joyces/Verigreens, though they entice Yuks/Kruds into fits of laughter. Strangely, a few Yuks/Kruds - such as Acylius/Maximillian, Krabo/Draffsack and probably Queen Bakrakra/Katheter - are not affected by them.

Dragonfly Squadron
 The Joyce's main line of defense, these mechanical dragonflies fire blasts of pollen similar to those of the Kolour Guitar from their abdomens.

Flower Konnons
 The Joyce's new weapons that only appeared in 'No Presents for Khristmas' and shoot like the Kolour Guitar.

Kolour Dynamites
 Colourful explosions used by Fulgor/Flynn. When the Yuks/Kruds are harvesting flowers for heat, The dynamite explodes with multiple colors that make the Yuks/Kruds laugh.

Yuks

The Hotsy Totsy (Hypertherm)
 The Hotsy Totsy is a fireplace that keeps the queen warm when the Yuks/Kruds cut down the flowers and made logs or carry sticks for heat. It also keeps the water from flooding the city and powers up The Dark Box.

The Dark Box  (Krud'o'Pod)
 The Krud'o'Pod is a machine that undoes the effect of the Kolour Guitar/Musical Colour Gun, reverting affected Yuks/Kruds back to their normal selves. It is implied by Lord Krabo that the Dark Box may turn Joyces into Yuks. More info about the Krud'o'Pod was in 'Ruling Classes.'

Hoverbikes (Bikes/Krudmobile)
 Hoverbikes that are mostly used by Krabouic/Drumsturdy and Kaboche/Greeb.

Kreatur
 It is the robot-mechanic of the engineer Teknocratus, it serves as an elevator, robot welder, electro-mechanics and 'vulture of function' to the scientist. His intellectual quotient is 0.5.

 Kat-Kat 
 Off-road vehicle, able to cross deserts, mountains, and a marsh in the summer. It is intended for the transport of Yuk/Krud troops and the invasion missions of the Joyce territory.

Koa (Frogbuckets)
 Giant frog-like war machines, the Koa/Frogbuckets act as both the Yuks'/Kruds' heavy fighting forces and as material collectors. Usually controlled by two pilots, they are fully amphibious and their hulls are completely immune to Joyce/Verigreen pollen blasts. Teknocratus/Synapse insists the proper name for the machines is 'Hydroscopic Amphibious Personal Relocation Units'.

The Koleopter (The Hovermower)
 Resembling a giant flying beetle, it is a two-pilot airborne resource gathering machine with a rotating blade for cutting flower stems. It has 'Fightermites' for defense against the 'Dragonflies'. It can load and unload many goods and can also act as a vacuum cleaner when collecting nectar. Teknocratus/Synapse insists its proper name is the 'Anti-Gravity Daffodil Collector'.

Sky Breaker (Cloud Clearer)
 A huge laser cannon that is only seen in 'The Weather ForeKast,' and 'No Presents for Khristmas,' which was designed to cause drought, but when tested during rain, it created snow instead of drought. Annoyed, Krabo/Draffsack ended up ripping it apart, even after it created hot snow. A similar Cloud Clearer was seen in 'Katiklysme/Comet' which is a fusion of Yuk/Krud and Joyce/Verigreen technology. This machine almost destroyed The Flower City.

"Tweet-Tweet" (Chicken)
 Only used in 'If Chickens Could Fly,' the "Chicken" is bird-shaped, and was sent to steal The Great Prism. The Chicken was an airborne war machine controlled by two pilots. The first design, which flew with small propellers, crashed into a moat during a trial run. The second design had bigger propellers, but that too crashed. The third design had a jet engine on top of the fuselage, which landed it safely, though with a broken engine. It was the fourth design that really took off to steal The Great Prism, but after fighting off the Joyces/Verigreens, it was sliced down the middle when it got a hold of The Great Prism. It made other appearances in two episodes, 'A Spectre Kalls,' and 'No Presents for Khristmas.'

"Kalkulator"  (Sparky)

 A supercomputer used in the episode of the same name. Built by Synapse the computer mechanized Krud city, all inhabitants received a door operating PIN, Verigreen detectors and automated defenses were placed. Draffsack himself had problems with the design, seeing as he chose the PIN 1,999,999,999. However, the main feature of the computer was its Auto-mated Lumberjacks. To stop the latter Flynn sneaked into the city in a Hold of one of the lumberjacks and evaded capture as only Synapse knew a B12 alert meant a Verigreen was in the city. (Greeb: Good thing you know it, I don't have to look it up in a codebook. Drum-sturdy: There's a codebook?). The system was corrupted by a colored data card which had been hit by Flynn's color gun. After Krud city went mad Draffsack ordered the scrapping of Sparky.

"Auto-mated lumberjacks"

 Minions of Sparky, these machines were virtually indestructible to Verigreen technology and able to decimate the flower forest. A unique feature was a color detector which enabled them to home in and attack Verigreen technology. This was exploited by the Verigreens who used color sprays to lure the machines over a cliff. However, during the night they righted themselves and resurfaced out of the water. They were ultimately defeated with the downfall of Sparky despite their incredible success. As of the events in 'No Presents for Khristmas' they were still seen working on a small scale during Krud raids, mainly to stop Verigreens hiding in their holds.

Koal Juice Guns

 The Yuk counterpart to the Kolour Guitar. Being hit by koal juice causes depression in Joyces, which may be cured by the energies of the prism. Most Yuk soldiers and most vehicles are armed with the weapons. Yuks appeared immune to Koal juice, but it still becomes stuck to them, as it does with Joyces. Koal juice itself is a dull green substance.

Vokalizers
 A walkie-talkie-like microphone that the Yuks/Kruds used after their voices were affected. It only appeared in a two-parter "It's Katching/Epidemik" and "The Kure". A similar Vokalizer was seen in "Fulgor's Kwest/Krud Konfession", possibly as a prototype.

Story
The series takes place on the planet Karbon/Krud, though the UK dub does include references to locations on Earth. Episode 6; Planet Karbon/The Black Planet reveals that Karbon/Krud was originally a dark, colorless rock inhabited by a single race of insects; the Yuks/Kruds. The Yuks/Kruds survived the planet's hostile environment by burrowing deep into it for coal. At one point, a Prism shaped meteor hit the planet and nourished the site on which it landed with color and energy, resulting in a flower-filled paradise. A few of the Yuks/Kruds colonized the area and evolved colors of their own, renaming themselves Joyces/Verigreens. They venerated the Prism and built a high altar upon it. The Yuks/Kruds who chose to stick to their original lives continued mining for coal till they gradually exhausted their supplies. The animosity between the two insect civilizations began when a violent Yuk/Krud known as King Bakrako/Katheter the First came up with the solution of using the Joyce's/Verigreen's flower stalks as substitute fuel sources. Gradually, all memory of the two civilizations once being the same people was lost, and ever since they have been enemies.

Episode list

VHS/DVDs

Known cast

French version
 Christian Alers
 Daniel Lafourcade
 Pierre Baton
 Jacques Brunnet
 Alexandre Gillet
 Raphaelle Moutier
 Jean-Claude Sachot
 Lucienne Troka

NA version
 David Gasman
 Karen Strassman
 Christian Erickson
 Bela Grushka
 Edouard Marcus
 Paul Bandey

UK version
 Teddy Kempner
 Caroline Bliss
 Andy Secombe 
 Neil McCaul

External links
 

1990s French animated television series
1994 French television series debuts
1995 French television series endings
Channel 4 original programming
French computer-animated television series
French children's animated comedy television series
French children's animated fantasy television series
French children's animated musical television series
YTV (Canadian TV channel) original programming
English-language television shows
Animated television series about insects
Canal+ original programming